This is a List of Deputy Commissioners of the Northwest Territories, Canada that have served since the position was created in 1921.

References

External links

Deputy commissioners